Curtis Cunz is an American rugby league and former rugby union player and owns the 4 time National champions Connecticut Wildcats, most recently winning the premiere in the AMNRL in 2013.

Rugby Union
He is a former rugby union player for the Old Blue New York club in the USA Rugby Super League.[1] His position was center.

Rugby League
He is the most capped USA rugby league player (25) of all time.[2] and was involved in their 42-10 loss to Samoa in 2007.[3] Cunz was selected to be a part of the USA Tomahawks Rugby League World Cup Squad as ambassador for the tournament. Due to a career threatening bicep tear he was asked to fulfil that roll rather than playing. Cunz was voted in by the AMNRL Board to be the president of the league in early 2014.

He is the most capped USA Tomahawks player of all time. and was involved in their 42-10 loss to Samoa in 2007.

References

External links
Profile at rugbyleagueproject

American rugby league players
United States national rugby league team players
Connecticut Wildcats rugby league players
New York Knights players
Year of birth missing (living people)
Living people
Rugby league second-rows